"My Name Is Human" is a song by American rock band Highly Suspect. It was released as the lead single from their second studio album The Boy Who Died Wolf in 2016. The song reached No. 1 on the Billboard Mainstream Rock chart and stayed there for eight weeks. It is their first number one single. The song is also their highest charting single on the Alternative Songs, Hot Rock Songs and Rock Airplay charts, where it peaked at No. 20, No. 12 and No. 7 respectively. The song was nominated for Best Rock Song at the 59th Annual Grammy Awards.

Background
The song was released on September 7, 2016. Said Johnny Stevens of the song, “A lot of people think the song is about being a human. I believe some of us aren’t human at all. Or at least not completely, but that is still our name. At some point in the last couple hundred years something changed. The androids, the aliens...They aren’t coming. We are here."

Music video
The music video was released through Vanity Fair on February 23, 2017. It begins in a futuristic setting with a female lifelike robot being assembled, portrayed by actress Chloe Bridges in its final form, and is intercut with Johnny Stevens singing and viewing the robot's features up close. Blue crystal-like formations appear to grow out of the floor, as more robots appear, standing in formation behind Stevens. It ends with Bridges resting her head on Stevens' shoulder while a red light flashes beneath his skin.

Charts

Weekly charts

Year-end charts

Certifications

References

2016 singles
2016 songs
Highly Suspect songs
300 Entertainment singles